Smilo may refer to:

 Smilo Freiherr von Lüttwitz (1895–1975), German World War II general
 John Smilo, 29th bishop of Zagreb - see Paul Horvat, his predecessor
 Smilo (band), a Swedish electronic dance music trio
 Smilo-, a taxonomic affix

See also
 Piptatherum miliaceum, a grass species commonly called smilograss